Luís Manuel Gonçalves Marques Mendes, GCIH (born 5 September 1957, in Guimarães, Azurém) is a Portuguese lawyer and politician, and a former Leader of the Social Democratic Party.

Background
He is a son of António Marques Mendes and wife Maria Isabel Gonçalves.

Career
He is a Licentiate in Law from the Faculty of Law of the University of Coimbra.

He started his career as a lawyer.

As a member of the Social Democratic Party he became Secretary of State and Spokesman of the Government of Prof. Aníbal Cavaco Silva. He has also been a Deputy to the Portuguese Assembly of the Republic.

He was elected the President of his Party in 2005 after Pedro Santana Lopes and was succeeded in September 2007 by Luís Filipe Menezes.

He is also a Member of the Portuguese Council of State, elected by the Assembly of the Republic.

Family
He married in Guimarães, Vermil, on 24 April 1982, to Rosa Sofia Pinto Martins Salazar, born in Guimarães, Vermil, on 8 May 1957, a Licentiate in Modern Literatures and Languages (English and German), daughter of António Martins Fernandes Salazar (b. Guimarães, Vermil, Calçada, 19 May 1931), an Industrialist, one of the pioneers of the Ave, Subregion industrialization, and wife (m. Vila do Conde, São Miguel de Arcos, 21 April 1955) Berta da Silva Pinto (Penafiel, Penafiel, 23 May 1934 – Guimarães, Creixomil, 13 February 1995), and paternal granddaughter of José Fernandes Salazar (Guimarães, Vermil, 3 March 1890 – Porto, Miragaia, 1 December 1975), an Industrialist, one of the pioneers of the Ave, Subregion industrialization, and wife (m. Guimarães, Ronfe, 19 February 1925) Rosa Correia da Silva Martins (Guimarães, Ronfe, 2 January 1897 – Porto, Cedofeita, 31 August 1972). The couple has three children: 
 João Pedro Pinto Salazar Marques Mendes (b. Fafe, Fafe, 2 January 1986)
 Ana Sofia Pinto Salazar Marques Mendes (b. Fafe, Fafe, 10 April 1988)

Honours
  Grand-Cross of the Order of Prince Henry, Portugal (6 June 2008)

Electoral history

PSD leadership election, 2006

|- style="background-color:#E9E9E9"
! align="center" colspan=2 style="width:  60px"|Candidate
! align="center" style="width:  50px"|Votes
! align="center" style="width:  50px"|%
|-
|bgcolor=orange|
| align=center | Luís Marques Mendes
| align=center | 18,525
| align=center | 90.8
|-
|bgcolor=white|
| align=center | Blank Ballots
| align=center | 1,512
| align=center | 7.4
|-
|bgcolor=white|
| align=center | Invalid Ballots
| align=center | 362
| align=center | 1.8
|-
|- style="background-color:#E9E9E9"
| colspan=2 style="text-align:center;" |   Turnout
| align=center | 20,399
| align=center | 36.76
|-
|}

  (Source: Official results)

PSD leadership election, 2007

|- style="background-color:#E9E9E9"
! align="center" colspan=2 style="width:  60px"|Candidate
! align="center" style="width:  50px"|Votes
! align="center" style="width:  50px"|%
|-
|bgcolor=orange|
| align=center | Luís Filipe Menezes
| align=center | 20,701
| align=center | 54.1
|-
|bgcolor=orange|
| align=center | Luís Marques Mendes
| align=center | 16,334
| align=center | 42.7
|-
|bgcolor=white|
| align=center | Blank/Invalid Ballots
| align=center | 1,235
| align=center | 3.2
|-
|- style="background-color:#E9E9E9"
| colspan=2 style="text-align:center;" |   Turnout
| align=center | 38,270
| align=center | 60.71
|-
|}

  (Source: Official results)

References

1957 births
Living people
Social Democratic Party (Portugal) politicians
Members of the Assembly of the Republic (Portugal)
20th-century Portuguese lawyers
People from Guimarães
University of Coimbra alumni